Iván Carril Regueiro (born 13 February 1985 in Rebordaos, Santiago de Compostela, Galicia) is a Spanish professional footballer who plays as a midfielder.

Football career
After a brief spell with FC Barcelona, Carril completed his football grooming at local giants Deportivo de La Coruña. He was mainly registered for several years with the club's B-side, but managed to appear in ten games with the first team, all in the 2005–06 season; his debut came on 28 August 2005 in a 0–1 away win against RCD Mallorca, his only start.

After several loans in the following years (two halves at UD Vecindario and CF Palencia), Carril was released by Depor in 2009 but stayed in Galicia, signing with lowly Pontevedra CF. In summer 2010 he moved to Austria, going on to play three full Bundesliga campaigns with SV Ried; he spent the vast majority of 2012–13 nursing an Achilles tendon ailment, being released at its conclusion.

Personal life
Carril's older brother, Jonathan, was also a footballer. He played, amongst others, with the B-teams of Deportivo and Atlético Madrid.

Club statistics

Honours
Deportivo B
Tercera División: 2005–06, 2006–07

Ried
Austrian Cup: 2010–11

References

External links

1985 births
Living people
Spanish footballers
Footballers from Santiago de Compostela
Association football midfielders
La Liga players
Segunda División players
Segunda División B players
Tercera División players
Deportivo Fabril players
Deportivo de La Coruña players
UD Vecindario players
CF Palencia footballers
Pontevedra CF footballers
CE L'Hospitalet players
Austrian Football Bundesliga players
SV Ried players
Football League (Greece) players
Olympiacos Volos F.C. players
New Zealand Football Championship players
Auckland City FC players
Spanish expatriate footballers
Expatriate footballers in Austria
Expatriate footballers in Greece
Expatriate association footballers in New Zealand
Spanish expatriate sportspeople in Austria
Spanish expatriate sportspeople in Greece
Spanish expatriate sportspeople in New Zealand